

R

References